Heart for Heaven is a 2015 Chinese comedy film directed by Zhang Cheng. It was released in China on December 31, 2015.

Plot

Cast
Shen Teng
Mary Ma
Du Xiaoyu
Lam Suet
Wang Zizi
Marc
Su Zhidan
Xu Ruoqi

Reception
The film grossed  on its opening at the Chinese box office.

References

2015 comedy films
Chinese comedy films